Jeff Kruse (born September 7, 1951) is a former Republican member of the Oregon Senate, representing the 1st District from 1996 until his resignation for sexual harassment in 2018.

Committees
Kruse formerly sat on the following Senate Committees:
 Education and General Government, Vice Chair
 Health and Human Services, Vice Chair
 Public Education Appropriation, Member
 Services to Seniors and People with Disabilities, Vice Chair

Native American mascot controversy
In July 2013, Kruse gained national attention by appearing in a CNN video news story about a bill he sponsored. His bill would reverse an existing Oregon law requiring public schools to remove what some colleagues consider "racist" and "insensitive" references to Native Americans on their sports team's uniforms. Prior to the enactment of the 2012 Oregon law, the State Superintendent of Schools had determined that the continued use of Native American mascots has created a "hostile educational environment". Schools have been given until 2017 to comply with the required change. In defending his bill, Kruse has asked: "do we change the entire world for the small few [sic]? He graduated from Roseburg High School whose mascot is "the Indians". This mascot is frequently depicted in cartoons as clownish or as a charging warrior. The images have offended citizens of Native American descent and caused local controversy.

Sexual harassment allegations

In October 2017, Kruse was removed from all of his Senate committee assignments by Senate President Peter Courtney. An article in The Oregonian indicated that Kruse had been accused of inappropriate touching and had failed to resolve ongoing workplace issues.

The removal came days after Senator Sara Gelser indicated that Kruse had inappropriately touched her. Senator Ginny Burdick supported Gelser's allegations, calling Kruse's behavior a "chronic problem", recalling an incident where she had to tell Kruse to get his hands off of Gelser and another incident where Kruse had inappropriately touched a female staffer on the Senate floor.

Kruse's smoking violations in his Capitol office were also a factor in the sanctions. He categorically denied any inappropriate behavior while acknowledging that "the smoking still is an issue that I will not deny."

On February 9, 2018, Kruse announced his resignation, to take effect March 15, 2018.

On April 17, 2018 fellow member of the Douglas County delegation Dallas Heard succeeded Kruse as State Senator for the Oregon State Senate 1st District.

References

External links
Senator Jeff Kruse – official website
Project Vote Smart – Senator Jeff Kruse (OR) profile
Follow the Money – campaign contributions

1951 births
Living people
Republican Party Oregon state senators
Republican Party members of the Oregon House of Representatives
Willamette University alumni
21st-century American politicians